Bel-ibni was a Babylonian nobleman who served as King of Babylon for several years as the nominee of the Assyrian king Sennacherib.

Sennacherib, believing that direct Assyrian rule was too costly, appointed Bel-ibni, a young Babylonian nobleman raised at the Assyrian court, King of Babylon in 703 BC.

The experiment with a native puppet king was hardly more successful than direct Assyrian control. Soon Bel-ibni was conspiring with the Chaldeans and Elamites against the Assyrians.  After defeating the opposing coalition in 700 BC, Sennacherib deposed Bel-ibni and carried him off to Assyrian exile, replacing him with Sennacherib's own son, Ashur-nadin-shumi.

References

8th-century BC births
7th-century BC deaths
8th-century BC Babylonian kings
7th-century BC Babylonian kings
Year of birth unknown